The Judicial General Council of Mongolia (Mongol Ulsyn Shüükhiin Yerönkhii Zövlöl) is an organ of the Mongolian judiciary mandated by the Constitution of Mongolia to maintain the independence of the judiciary, represent the Mongolian judiciary and advise on the selection and removal of judicial officers.

Background
The Council consists of 5 members being appointed by the President of Mongolia.

In fulfilling its constitutional mandate, the Council submits recommendations to the State Great Khural and the President on the establishment and structure of the court system, their personnel, appointments and release of judicial officers. Further, it selects and examines judicial officers, upgrades their skills and qualifications through training, and distributes budgets and controls over expenditure of funds.

The council has been at the centre of ongoing judicial reform efforts in Mongolia. It has received assistance from the United States Agency for International Development to improve budgeting, enhance the capacity of court administrators and develop a national case information database. The council has also assisted aid organizations in attempts to curb corruption within the Mongolian judiciary.

Structure
The council is currently organized in the following manner.

Working division
 Executive Secretariat
 Judicial Management Office
 Judges' Resource Office
 Judicial Finance and Investment Office
 Judicial External Relations Department
 Judicial Media and Public Relations Department
 Judicial Internal Auditing Division
 Judicial Research and Information center.

Ethics committee
 Head of the Ethics Committee
 Members of the Ethics Committee
 Ethics Committee Office

Qualifications committee
 Head of the Qualification Committee
 Members of the Qualification Committee
 Qualification Committee Office

Mediation committee
 Head of the Mediation Committee
 Members of the Qualification Committee

References

External links

Judiciary of Mongolia
Year of establishment missing